The Treaty between France and Spain regarding Morocco was signed on 27 November 1912 by French and Spanish heads of state, establishing de jure a Spanish Zone of influence in northern and southern Morocco, both zones being de facto under Spanish control, while France was still regarded as the protecting power as it was the sole occupying power to sign the Treaty of Fez.

The northern part was to become the zone of the Spanish protectorate in Morocco with its capital in Tetuan, while the southern part was ruled from El Aiun as a buffer zone between the Spanish Colony of Rio de Oro and French Morocco.

Signing 

The treaty was signed by the Spanish  García Prieto and the French ambassador Léon Geoffray at the Santa Cruz Palace in Madrid on November 27, 1912.

References 

1912 in Morocco
Treaties concluded in 1912
Treaties of the French Third Republic
France–Spain relations
November 1912 events